This is a list of the largest trading partners of the Netherlands based on data from The Observatory of Economic Complexity (OEC).

Countries & regions which the Netherlands is the largest trading partner of
The Netherlands is a dominant trading partner of several countries. The following tables are based on 2015 data as shown on the CIA World Factbook unless otherwise indicated. Some countries are repeated from the previous table.

See also
Economy of the Netherlands
List of the largest trading partners of the United States
List of the largest trading partners of the ASEAN
List of the largest trading partners of China
List of the largest trading partners of Russia
List of the largest trading partners of Germany
List of the largest trading partners of the European Union

References

Foreign trade of the Netherlands
Economy-related lists of superlatives
Lists of trading partners
Economy of the Netherlands-related lists